The Silent Knight is a DC Comics character.

Silent Knight may also refer to:

Silent Knight (album), a 1980 album by Saga
Silent Knight Shō, a manga by Masami Kurumada
A variant of the Knight engine, for automobiles

See also
Silent Night (disambiguation)